
Gmina Perlejewo is a rural gmina (administrative district) in Siemiatycze County, Podlaskie Voivodeship, in north-eastern Poland.

Villages
Gmina Perlejewo contains the villages and settlements of Borzymy, Czarkówka Duża, Czarkówka Mała, Głęboczek, Głody, Granne, Kobyla, Koski Duże, Koski-Wypychy, Kruzy, Leśniki, Leszczka Duża, Leszczka Mała, Miodusy-Dworaki, Miodusy-Inochy, Miodusy-Pokrzywne, Moczydły-Dubiny, Moczydły-Kukiełki, Moczydły-Pszczółki, Nowe Granne, Olszewo, Osnówka, Osnówka-Wyręby, Pełch, Perlejewo, Pieczyski, Poniaty, Stare Moczydły, Twarogi Lackie, Twarogi Ruskie, Twarogi-Mazury, Twarogi-Trąbnica, Twarogi-Wypychy and Wiktorowo.

Neighbouring gminas
Gmina Perlejewo is bordered by the gminas of Ciechanowiec, Drohiczyn, Grodzisk and Jabłonna Lacka.

References
Polish official population figures 2006

Perlejewo
Siemiatycze County